The following radio stations broadcast on FM frequency 100.1 MHz:

Argentina
 Radio Continental Rosario in Rosario, Santa Fe
 Radio María in General Alvear, Mendoza

Australia
 3SPH in Shepparton, Victoria
 5GTR in Mount Gambier, South Australia
 4QBB in Bundaberg, Queensland
 6NR in Perth, Western Australia
 8HOT in Darwin, Northern Territory
 Life FM (Bathurst) in Bathurst, New South Wales
 2HHH in Sydney, New South Wales
 Triple J in Bega, New South Wales

Belize
Hamaalali Radio at Dangriga, Stann Creek District

Canada (Channel 261)
 CBF-FM-7 in Radisson, Quebec
 CBKG-FM in Fond-du-Lac, Saskatchewan
 CBRL-FM in Lethbridge, Alberta
 CBSI-FM-17 in La Tabatiere, Quebec
 CBYW-FM in Whistler, British Columbia
 CFDE-FM in Keyano, Quebec
 CFGQ-FM-2 in Banff, Alberta
 CHCQ-FM in Belleville, Ontario
 CHFN-FM in Neyaashiinigmiing, Ontario
 CHLP-FM in Listowel, Ontario
 CHOX-FM-3 in Saint-Aubert, Quebec
 CIAM-FM-10 in Buckland, Saskatchewan
 CIOO-FM in Halifax, Nova Scotia
 CJCD-FM in Yellowknife, Northwest Territories
 CJCD-FM-1 in Hay River, Northwest Territories
 CJEB-FM in Trois-Rivieres, Quebec
 CJGR-FM in Gold River, British Columbia
 CJNK-FM in Algonquin Park, Ontario
 CJVD-FM in Vaudreuil, Quebec
 CKAG-FM in Pikogan, Quebec
 CKBZ-FM in Kamloops, British Columbia
 CKFU-FM in Fort St. John, British Columbia
 CKVB-FM in Corner Brook, Newfoundland and Labrador
 CKVL-FM in Lasalle, Quebec
 VF2002 in Donald Station, British Columbia
 VF2041 in Pelly Crossing, Yukon
 VF2223 in Dease Lake, British Columbia

Hungary

Magyarország
 Győr + Rádió in Győr

Malaysia
 TraXX FM in Selangor & Western Pahang

Mexico
 XHARZ-FM in Aguascalientes, Aguascalientes
 XHCBR-FM in Caborca, Sonora
 XHCNA-FM in Culiacán, Sinaloa
 XHCSAE-FM in Ciudad Obregon, Sonora
 XHHPC-FM in Hidalgo del Parral, Chihuahua
 XHJT-FM in Tampico, Tamaulipas
XHMBR-FM in Boca del Río, Veracruz
 XHMM-FM in Mexico City
 XHNE-FM in Coatzacoalcos, Veracruz
 XHOQ-FM in Oaxaca, Oaxaca
 XHPEFB-FM in Los Ramones, Nuevo León
 XHPHUA-FM in Huajuapan de León, Oaxaca
 XHPM-FM in San Luis Potosí, San Luis Potosí
 XHRCH-FM in Ojinaga, Chihuahua
 XHSE-FM in Acapulco, Guerrero
 XHTIX-FM in Temixco, Morelos
 XHUD-FM in Tuxtla Gutiérrez, Chiapas
 XHXK-FM in Poza Rica, Veracruz
 XHYU-FM in Mérida, Yucatán

Paraguay
ZPV100 at Asunción

Taiwan
 International Community Radio Taipei in Central Taiwan (Not included Chiayi, Chiayi County,  Yunlin)

Ukraine
 Radio One in Mykolaiv
 Kiss FM in Feodosiya

United States (Channel 261)

 KATQ-FM in Plentywood, Montana
 KBBM in Jefferson City, Missouri
 KCHQ in Soda Springs, Idaho
 KCLL in San Angelo, Texas
 KCMG-LP in Lovington, New Mexico
 KCTN in Garnavillo, Iowa
 KDJR in De Soto, Missouri
 KGBA-FM in Holtville, California
 KGMN in Kingman, Arizona
 KHSJ-LP in Las Vegas, Nevada
 KHWG-FM in Crystal, Nevada
 KHZZ-LP in Hays, Kansas
 KJBI in Fort Pierre, South Dakota
 KJDE in Carbon, Texas
 KJHR-LP in Teton Village, Wyoming
 KKLJ in Julian, California
 KKSC-LP in Silver City, New Mexico
 KKTY-FM in Glendo, Wyoming
 KKWK in Cameron, Missouri
 KKZQ in Tehachapi, California
 KMEH-LP in Helena, Montana
 KMMR in Malta, Montana
 KMXT (FM) in Kodiak, Alaska
 KNRB in Atlanta, Texas
 KOLV in Olivia, Minnesota
 KOMC-FM in Kimberling City, Missouri
 KONN-LP in Kansas City, Missouri
 KPKA-LP in Beatrice, Nebraska
 KQBQ in Meyersville, Texas
 KQFO in Pasco, Washington
 KQOD in Stockton, California
 KRAQ-LP in Rancho Mirage, California
 KRFD in Fleming, Colorado
 KRVV in Bastrop, Louisiana
 KSDH-LP in Great Bend, Kansas
 KUYY in Emmetsburg, Iowa
 KVNA-FM in Flagstaff, Arizona
 KWEE in Dayton, Nevada
 KWFX in Woodward, Oklahoma
 KWHQ-FM in Kenai, Alaska
 KWSA in Price, Utah
 KXRB-FM in Brandon, South Dakota
 KYBI in Lufkin, Texas
 KYFM in Bartlesville, Oklahoma
 KYKC in Byng, Oklahoma
 KYKD in Bethel, Alaska
 KZBA-LP in Bazine, Kansas
 KZOQ-FM in Missoula, Montana
 KZQA-LP in Amarillo, Texas
 KZRO in Dunsmuir, California
 KZST in Santa Rosa, California
 WASL (FM) in Dyersburg, Tennessee
 WBCH-FM in Hastings, Michigan
 WBCM-LP in Bristol, Virginia
 WBPV-LP in Bradenton, Florida
 WBRR in Bradford, Pennsylvania
 WBRS in Waltham, Massachusetts
 WBXB in Edenton, North Carolina
 WCLG-FM in Morgantown, West Virginia
 WDDC in Portage, Wisconsin
 WDMX in Vienna, West Virginia
 WDST in Woodstock, New York
 WDXX in Selma, Alabama
 WFBM-LP in Beaver Springs, Pennsylvania
 WFCV-FM in Bluffton, Indiana
 WFLQ in French Lick, Indiana
 WFRI in Winamac, Indiana
 WFVY in Lebanon, Pennsylvania
 WGGF-LP in Sun City Center, Florida
 WGLC-FM in Mendota, Illinois
 WGOT-LP in Gainesville, Florida
 WGSY in Phenix City, Alabama
 WHFF-LP in Hammond, Louisiana
 WHHC-LP in New Castle, Indiana
 WHOU-FM in Houlton, Maine
 WILA in Live Oak, Florida
 WIWT-LP in Jackson, Mississippi
 WJBD-FM in Salem, Illinois
 WJPP-LP in Palm City, Florida
 WJRZ-FM in Manahawkin, New Jersey
 WKAI in Macomb, Illinois
 WKQQ in Winchester, Kentucky
 WKQY in Tazewell, Virginia
 WLAY-FM in Littleville, Alabama
 WLCW in West Salem, Wisconsin
 WMAN-FM in Shelby, Ohio
 WMDJ-FM in Allen, Kentucky
 WNIR (FM) in Kent, Ohio
 WNSY in Talking Rock, Georgia
 WPNH-FM in Plymouth, New Hampshire
 WPTP-LP in Chattanooga, Tennessee
 WPUP in Washington, Georgia
 WQFN in Forest City, Pennsylvania
 WQMJ in Forsyth, Georgia
 WQXB in Grenada, Mississippi
 WRHN in Rhinelander, Wisconsin
 WRHP in Anniston, Alabama
 WRLT in Franklin, Tennessee
 WRPK-LP in Kilmarnock, Virginia
 WSER-LP in Lenoir, North Carolina
 WSHT-LP in Indianapolis, Indiana
 WSJP-FM in Port Washington, Wisconsin
 WUBP-LP in St. Petersburg, Florida
 WUPE-FM in North Adams, Massachusetts
 WVBE-FM in Lynchburg, Virginia
 WVBI-LP in Beaver Island, Michigan
 WVIB in Holton, Michigan
 WVMD in Romney, West Virginia
 WVVF-LP in Town N' Country, Florida
 WWFN-FM in Lake City, South Carolina
 WWFX in Southbridge, Massachusetts
 WWLY in Panama City Beach, Florida
 WWOT in Altoona, Pennsylvania
 WXBT in West Columbia, South Carolina
 WXMM-LP in Galax, Virginia
 WXTJ-LP in Charlottesville, Virginia
 WXWS-LP in Bone Gap, Illinois
 WXYY in Rincon, Georgia
 WXZQ in Piketon, Ohio
 WZFJ in Pequot Lakes, Minnesota
 WZJZ in Port Charlotte, Florida

References

Lists of radio stations by frequency